A list of films produced in Hong Kong in 1951:.

1951

References

External links
 IMDB list of Hong Kong films
 Hong Kong films of 1951 at HKcinemamagic.com

1951
Hong Kong
Films